The 1948 East Tennessee State Buccaneers football team was an American football team that represented East Tennessee State College (ETSC)—now known as East Tennessee State University—as an independent during the 1948 college football season. Led by second-year head coach Loyd Roberts, the Buccaneers compiled a record of 6–2–1.

The team received an increased budget of $8,050. Roberts hired Madison Brooks as line coach (and also as assistant director of athletics and head basketball coach) and Julian Doss Crocker as backfield coach and track mentor.

Schedule

References

East Tennessee State
East Tennessee State Buccaneers football seasons
East Tennessee State Buccaneers football